Copriphis is a genus of mites in the family Eviphididae. There are at least three described species in Copriphis.

Species
These three species belong to the genus Copriphis:
 Copriphis crinitus (Berlese, 1882)
 Copriphis falcinellus (R. & G.Canestrini, 1882)
 Copriphis pterophilus (Berlese, 1882)

References

Mesostigmata
Articles created by Qbugbot